Aristobia approximator is a species of beetle in the Longhorn family. This species grows to 36mm.

Description
This species has a black body with yellow spots, and black tufts on the basal antennomeres, similar to the related species Aristobia reticulator; however, A. approximator has tufts only on the 3rd antennal segment, while A. reticulator has tufts on segments 3, 4, and sometimes 5.

Diet and distribution
This species is documented as feeding on teak.

References

Lamiini
Beetles described in 1865